Angel Gil-Ordóñez is a Spanish-born American conductor who co-founded the PostClassical Ensemble with music historian Joseph Horowitz and serves as its Music Director. He is also the Principal Guest Conductor of New York’s Perspectives Ensemble and the Music Director of the Georgetown University Orchestra in Washington, D.C. Additionally, he serves as advisor for education and programming for Trinitate Philharmonia, a program in Mexico modeled on Venezuela’s El Sistema, and is also a regular guest conductor at the Bowdoin International Music Festival in Maine.

Background 
Born in Spain on September 5, 1957, Gil-Ordoñez grew up in an intellectual family that valued Spanish culture. He focused on violin in his teens.  For university, he reached a compromise with his family:  they would allow him to study toward becoming a professional musician at the Madrid Conservatory of Music if he would first study Engineering at the Universidad Politecnica de Madrid.

Having completed both those degrees successfully, in 1974 he began higher-level music studies at the Conservatorio Superior de Música de Madrid.  There, he focused on violin, polyphony and choir conducting, harmony, counterpoint, and music history.  He also studied in the Musical Analysis Master Classes with Jacques Chailley.  He studied under Sergiu Celibidache for more than six years.  He also studied with Pierre Boulez and Iannis Xenakis in France.

In 1978, a concert of Sergiu Celibidache's conducting the London Symphony Orchestrat decided him:  he would become a conductor.  In 1983, he moved to France to study Contemporary Music at Paris's Centre Acanthes with Iannis Xenakis (composition), Irvine Arditti (violin), James Wood (choral conducting), and Claude Helffer and Rudolph Frisius (musical analysis). He also studied with Pierre Boulez (Conducting Master Classes) in Avignon.

In 1985, he moved to Munich to study with Munich Philharmonic's conductor Sergiu Celibidache.  He studied with: the Münchner Philharmoniker, the  Hochschule für Musik Mainz, Master Classes in Cluny and Paris, and Conducting Courses at the Scuola di Alto Perfezionamiento Musicale in Saluzzo, Italy.  He performed two assistantships at the Orchesterakademie des Schleswig-Holstein Musik Festival in Germany. From 1985 to 1991, he broadened studies across European repertoire and studied composition with Günter Bialas, Paul Engel, and  Fredrik Schwenk and violin with Rony Rogoff.

Conducting

In 1991, Gil-Ordóñez moved back to Spain for appointment to the National Symphony Orchestra of Spain as Associate Conductor. He founded the chamber orchestra Academia de Madrid, of which he became Music Director. He was also Principal Guest Conductor of the Classical Orchestra of Madrid.

In 1997, he came to Washington, DC, and founded musica aperta Washington, of which he was as Music Director 1997–2001. Also in 1997, he co-founded the IberArtists New York, Inc., of which he remains Music Director.

In 2000, he toured Spain with the Valencia Symphony Orchestra for the Spanish premiere of Leonard Bernstein's Mass.

On May 4, 2015, he led the Georgetown University Orchestra in a Cinco de Mayo performance for President Barack Obama.

Currently, he serves as follows:
 PostClassical Ensemble (Washington, DC):  Music Director and co-founder
 IberArtists (New York, NY):  Music Director and co- founder
 Perspectives Ensemble (New York, NY):  Principal Guest Conductor
 Trinitate Philharmonia (León, Mexico):  Advisor

He has also appeared with the following:
 American Composers Orchestra
 Opera Colorado
 Pacific Symphony
 Hartford Symphony
 Brooklyn Philharmonic
 Orchestra of St. Luke’s. Abroad

Other performance groups, venues, or events include:
 Munich Philharmonic
 Solistes de Berne
 Schleswig-Holstein Music Festival
 Bellas Artes National Theatre (Mexico City)

Personal

Gil-Ordoñez is married with one child.  He resides in Washington, DC.

He became an American citizen in 2009.

Teaching

As an educator, Gil-Ordonez current serves as Adjunct Professor and Music Director at Georgetown University's Department of Performing Arts in Washington, D.C.  He also serves as the Music Director of the Georgetown University Orchestra.

Awards

Since 2006, Gil-Ordóñez's title in Spanish has been "Caballero de la Real Orden de Isabel la Católica."

 2010 – WAMMIE Award for Classical
 2006 – La Real Orden de Isabel la Católica (Royal Order of Isabella the Catholic), Spain's highest civilian decoration, awarded by the King of Spain
 Various – named 3 times Naxos "Artist of the Week"

Works

Gil-Ordóñez appears on nine Naxos recordings.

Video (DVD)
 2016 - Redes - Silvestre Revueltas (conductor)
 2009 - The City -  Aaron Copland (conductor)
 2007 - The Plow that Broke the Plain, The River - Virgil Thomson (conductor)

Albums (CD)
 2019 - Falla: El amor brujo (1915 original version) / El retablo de Maese Pedro - Manuel de Falla (composer)
2017 - Lou Harrison: Violin Concerto / Grand Duo / Double Music - Lou Harrison (composer)
 2014 - Dvořák and America - Antonin Dvořák (conductor, arranger)
 2014 - Xavier Montsalvatge: Madrigal sobre un tema popular / 5 Invocaciones al Crucificado / Folia daliniana - Xavier Montsalvatge (composer)
 2013 - Madrigal sobre un tema popular, 5 Invocaciones al Crucificado, Folia daliniana - Xavier Montsalvatge (conductor)
 2007 - The Plow that Broke the Plain, The River - Virgil Thomson (conductor)

See also
 Sergiu Celibidache
 Pierre Boulez 
 Iannis Xenakis
 Aaron Copland
 Virgil Thomson
 Antonin Dvořák 
 Xavier Montsalvatge (conductor)
 Joseph Horowitz

References

External links
 Angel Gil-Ordóñez Official Website
 PostClassical Ensemble
 
 Faculty Profile Profile at Georgetown University Department of Performing Arts
 Naxos Biography
 NPR interview about The Plow That Broke the Plains and The River
 Getty Images

Spanish conductors (music)
Male conductors (music)
Wesleyan University faculty
Living people
1957 births
21st-century conductors (music)
21st-century male musicians
Spanish male musicians

de:Hochschule für Musik Mainz
de:Fredrik Schwenk